Shpëtim Idrizi (born 7 July 1967) is the Albanian leader of the Party for Justice, Integration and Unity (PDIU). He is a deputy in the Albanian Parliament, alongside Dashamir Tahiri, another PJU MP.

On December 10, 2012, Idrizi, and Dashamir Tahiri presented to the Parliament of Albania a resolution where PDIU asked from Greece reparations in the amount of 10 Billion Euros for the Expulsion of Cham Albanians.

References

Living people
Party for Justice, Integration and Unity politicians
Political party leaders of Albania
Members of the Parliament of Albania
21st-century Albanian politicians
Cham Albanians
1967 births